The Barnitzke machine gun is a prototype machine gun of late World War II German origin. The weapon uses an unusual delayed blowback operation, where during firing the bolt opening is delayed by the rotational inertia of two flywheels, which are driven by a rack and pinion arrangement on the bolt carrier.

See also
List of World War II firearms of Germany
MG 42, successor
MG 81 machine gun
MGD PM-9, an SMG with a flywheel delay

References

7.92×57mm Mauser machine guns
Delayed blowback firearms
General-purpose machine guns
Machine guns of Germany
World War II infantry weapons of Germany